Murphy Smith (born August 25, 1987) is an American former professional baseball pitcher who played in Major League Baseball (MLB) for the Toronto Blue Jays during the 2018 season.

Career
Smith attended Shenendehowa High School in Clifton Park, New York, and Binghamton University, where he played college baseball for the Binghamton Bearcats. He was named All-America East Conference in 2009.

Oakland Athletics
The Oakland Athletics selected him in the 13th round (393rd overall) of the 2009 MLB draft. He played the 2009 season with the AZL Athletics, Vancouver Canadians, and Kane County Cougars. He spent the 2010 season with the Cougars and the Stockton Ports, and would also spend the 2011 season with Stockton. In 2012, he was assigned to the Midland RockHounds, where he would play the 2012, 2013, and 2014 seasons. Despite being named a Texas League All-Star in 2012 and 2013, he did not receive a call-up and was released by the Athletics organization on April 2, 2015.

Toronto Blue Jays
On April 14, 2015, Murphy signed a minor league contract with the Toronto Blue Jays organization. He finished 2015 with the New Hampshire Fisher Cats and the Dunedin Blue Jays. He elected free agency on November 6, 2015. On November 18, he resigned to a minor league deal with Toronto and spent the 2016 season with New Hampshire and the Buffalo Bisons. That season, he earned his third career All-Star appearance, this time in the Eastern League. He elected free agency on November 7, 2016. He again resigned with the Blue Jays on a minor league pact on December 12. Smith spent the 2017 season between New Hampshire and Buffalo as well before electing free agency on November 6. On March 24, 2018, he again resigned with the Blue Jays organization. After pitching for the Buffalo Bisons in 2018, he was promoted to the major leagues on August 27, and debuted that day. He was designated for assignment on September 1. He elected free agency on November 2, 2018.

References

External links

1987 births
Living people
American expatriate baseball players in Canada
Arizona League Athletics players
Baseball players from New Hampshire
Binghamton Bearcats baseball players
Buffalo Bisons (minor league) players
Charros de Jalisco players
Dunedin Blue Jays players
Gigantes del Cibao players
American expatriate baseball players in the Dominican Republic
Kane County Cougars players
Major League Baseball pitchers
Midland RockHounds players
New Hampshire Fisher Cats players
Phoenix Desert Dogs players
Sportspeople from Nashua, New Hampshire
Stockton Ports players
Toronto Blue Jays players
Vancouver Canadians players
American expatriate baseball players in Mexico